Carla Körbes is a Brazilian ballet dancer who performed as a principal dancer with the Pacific Northwest Ballet, then became the associate artistic director of L.A Dance Project. She is now an associate professor at Indiana University Jacobs School of Music's ballet faculty.

Early life and training
Körbes was born in Porto Alegre, Brazil. She started ballet at age 5 and entered the Ballet Vera Bublitz school at age 11. At age 14, she danced Terpsichore in Apollo, partnering Peter Boal, then a New York City Ballet principal dancer and a guest at the school. After that, Boal recommended her to train at the School of American Ballet in New York City, even though she did not speak English at the time. Alexandra Danilova provided a year of Körbes' tuition. She received the Mae L. Wien Awards for Outstanding Promise in 1999.

Career
Körbes became an apprentice the New York City Ballet in 1999, and joined the company as a full-time corps de ballet member the following year. She received the Janice Levin Dancer Award in the 2001-02 season. She was named soloist in 2005. Later that year, she joined the Pacific Northwest Ballet in Seattle, when Boal became the artistic director of PNB. She made her company debut as a demi-soloist in Symphony in Three Movements. The following year, she was promoted to principal dancer. Her repertoire include full-length classics such as Swan Lake and Giselle, as well as George Balanchine's works and contemporary works. She was coached by Mimi Paul and Violette Verdy. In 2012, she danced the first revival of George Balanchine's Élégie in since its premiere, at the Vail International Dance Festival.

Körbes was named one of "25 to Watch" by Dance Magazine in 2006. Alastair Macaulay, dance critic of The New York Times, has repeatedly singled out her performances for praise. In 2010, during a nationwide tour of the Nutcracker season, he stated that Körbes was the best dancer he had seen of the tour, and in 2012, in a review of the Vail International Dance Festival, he stated that Körbes "is one of the finest ballerinas appearing in America today; some think her the finest, and last weekend I felt in no mood to contradict them."

In 2014, at age 33, Körbes announced she would leave PNB in June 2015, as "her body needs something different" following a knee surgery. Per PNB tradition, her final performance was a program for departing dancers, which she danced Jessica Lang's The Calling, Balanchine's Serenade and "Diamonds" from Jewels.

In 2015, Körbes was named an artist in residence at the Vail International Dance Festival. Later that year, she became the associate artistic director of L.A. Dance Project, which was directed by Benjamin Millepied. She also taught at the Colburn School in Los Angeles. She occasionally performs at festivals and galas.

In 2017 she joined the Indiana University Jacobs School of Music ballet faculty as an associate professor.

Personal life
In April 2015 she married British photographer Patrick Fraser and later that year gave birth to a baby boy named Rafael.

Selected repertoire
Körbes' repertoire with the New York City Ballet and Pacific Northwest Ballet includes:

References

External links
Indiana University profile
Carla Körbes in "Diamond" from Jewels
Carla Körbes in Roméo et Juliette

Brazilian ballerinas
New York City Ballet soloists
Pacific Northwest Ballet principal dancers
Living people
1980s births
Date of birth missing (living people)
School of American Ballet alumni
Mae L. Wien Award recipients
Janice Levin Award dancers
21st-century Brazilian dancers
21st-century ballet dancers
People from Porto Alegre
Brazilian expatriates in the United States
Indiana University faculty